Borbo is a genus of skipper butterflies (family Hesperiidae). They belong to the tribe Baorini, and as such are among those skippers commonly known as swifts.

Species

Species (and some subspecies) include:

 Borbo binga (Evans, 1937)
 Borbo borbonica Boisduval, 1833
 Borbo chagwa (Evans, 1937)
 Borbo cinnara (Wallace, 1866) – rice swift, Formosan swift
 Borbo detecta (Trimen, 1893)
 Borbo fallax (Gaede, 1916)
 Borbo fanta (Evans, 1937)
 Borbo fatuellus (Hopffer, 1855)
 Borbo ferruginea (Aurivillius, 1925)
 Borbo gemella (Mabille, 1884)
 Borbo havei (Boisduval, 1833)
 Borbo holtzii (Plötz, 1883)
 Borbo impar (Mabille, 1883)
 Borbo impar impar
 Borbo impar lavinia (Waterhouse, 1932)
 Borbo impar tetragaphus (Mabille, 1891)
 Borbo kaka (Evans, 1938)
 Borbo liana (Evans, 1937)
 Borbo lugens (Hopffer, 1855)
 Borbo micans (Holland, 1896)
 Borbo perobscura (Druce, 1912)
 Borbo ratek (Boisduval, 1833)
 Borbo sirena (Evans, 1937)

Species of unknown status
 Borbo philippina
 Borbo toshieae Maruyama, 1991

References
 Natural History Museum Lepidoptera genus database

External links

 Borbo at funet

Hesperiinae
Hesperiidae genera
Taxa named by William Harry Evans